The 1989–90 Divizia A was the seventy-second season of Divizia A, the top-level football league of Romania.

Teams

League table

Results

Top goalscorers

Champion squad

See also 

1989–90 Divizia B

References

Liga I seasons
Romania
1989–90 in Romanian football